The Couloir Cliffs are granite cliffs,  long and from  high, at the east side of Avalanche Bay in Granite Harbour, Victoria Land. They were named by the Granite Harbor Geological Party, led by Thomas Griffith Taylor, of the British Antarctic Expedition, 1910–13, because these cliffs have numerous chimneys and couloirs.

References 

Cliffs of Victoria Land
Scott Coast